Charles Matthews or Mathews may refer to:
 Charles Mathews (1776–1835), English theatre manager and actor
 Charles James Mathews (1803–1878), English actor, son of the above
 Charles Edward Mathews (1834–1905), English mountaineer
 Sir Charles Willie Mathews (1850–1920), English barrister and Director of Public Prosecutions, stepson of the above
 Charles Matthews (Pennsylvania politician) (1856–1932), member of the U.S. House of Representatives from Pennsylvania
 Charles Matthews (baseball), 19th-century American baseball player
 Race Mathews (Charles Race Thorson Mathews, born 1935), Australian politician
 Charles Matthews (Texas politician) (born 1939), former member of the Texas Railroad Commission
 Charles Matthews (Whitewater), Whitewater controversy defendant
 Charles Matthews (writer), one of the authors of How Wikipedia Works
 Charles Matthews (basketball) (born 1996), American basketball player
 Charles Matthews (neuropsychologist), president of the International Neuropsychological Society